The 1993 du Maurier Classic was contested from August 26–29 at London Hunt Club. It was the 21st edition of the du Maurier Classic, and the 15th edition as a major championship on the LPGA Tour.

This event was won by Brandie Burton in a sudden-death playoff with Betsy King with a birdie on the first extra playoff hole.

Final leaderboard

External links
 Golf Observer source

Canadian Women's Open
Sports competitions in London, Ontario
du Maurier Classic
du Maurier Classic
du Maurier Classic
du Maurier Classic